Eupithecia proflua is a moth in the family Geometridae. It is found in Kenya, Tanzania and Uganda.

Subspecies
Eupithecia proflua proflua
Eupithecia proflua subvincta Prout, 1932

References

Moths described in 1932
proflua
Moths of Africa